Bill Ceretti (March 10, 1912 – May 5, 1974), was an offensive and defensive lineman who played thirteen seasons for the Winnipeg Blue Bombers franchise. He was a three-time Grey Cup champion, having won in 1935, 1939, and 1941. In 1975, sportswriter Vince Leah called Ceretti "one of the finest Canadian-born linemen in the history of the game." In 2001, he was inducted into the Manitoba Sports Hall of Fame and Museum.

External links
Bill Ceretti’s biography at Manitoba Sports Hall of Fame and Museum

Winnipeg Blue Bombers players
Canadian football defensive linemen
Players of Canadian football from Manitoba
Canadian football people from Winnipeg
Manitoba Sports Hall of Fame inductees
1912 births
1974 deaths